This is a list of electoral results for the electoral district of Hervey Bay in Queensland state elections.

Members for Hervey Bay

Election results

Elections in the 2020s

Elections in the 2010s

The results for the 2015 election were:

Elections in the 2000s

Elections in the 1990s

References

Queensland state electoral results by district
Hervey Bay